The Convent of Saint Francis is a Franciscan convent located in the western, historic center of Fiesole in the region of Tuscany, Italy.

Located on Via San Francesco, it is not far from the Cathedral of Saint Romulus and the former Basilica of Sant'Alessandro.

History 
A small hermitage was built in 1399 on the site of the current convent by the Franciscans. At the end of the fifteenth century, the underground chapel was enlarged with an above-ground apse and choir. Between 1905 and 1906, the church underwent restoration by architect Giuseppe Castellucci, returning the church to a style similar to its original one.

The future 17th president of the Philippines, Ferdinand Bongbong Marcos, and future first lady, Liza Araneta Marcos, married at the convent in 1993.

Facilities 
The present complex consists in a church and convent.

Church

Exterior 
The facade of the church is Gothic in style with a gabled roof. It is constructed of stone blocks and masonry. At the center is a doorway with a porch, the inside of which contains a portrait of St. Francis. Above the door is a rose window.

Interior 
The interior of the church is in a simple Gothic style with a single nave covered by an arched barrel vault ceiling. The nave is divided into four bays. Among each the vaults are four side altars.

In the rear wall of the apse is a pipe organ built in 1938 by Mascioni. The organ has a fully electric drive. Its console has three keyboards with 61 notes each and a concave-radial pedalboard with 32 notes.

Convent 
The convent is located to the right of the church. Its main entrance faces the square and consists of a frescoed arch. The convent building is surrounded by three cloisters. The largest cloister comprises a four-sided portico covered by a cross vault ceiling.

Gallery

See also 

Fiesole Cathedral
Church of San Girolamo
Diocese of Fiesole
Episcopal Seminary of Fiesole

References

External links 

Official website

Buildings and structures in Fiesole
Churches in the metropolitan city of Florence
Romanesque architecture in Tuscany
Gothic architecture in Tuscany
Monasteries in Tuscany
Franciscan monasteries in Italy